The 1968 Omloop Het Volk was the 23rd edition of the Omloop Het Volk cycle race and was held on 2 March 1968. The race started and finished in Ghent. The race was won by Herman Van Springel.

General classification

References

1968
Omloop Het Nieuwsblad
Omloop Het Nieuwsblad